William James Bouwsma (November 22, 1923 – March 2, 2004) was an American scholar and historian of the European Renaissance. He was Sather Professor of History Emeritus at the University of California, Berkeley and president of the American Historical Association (AHA) in 1978.

Early life and education
Born in Ann Arbor, Michigan of Dutch descent, he was raised in Lincoln, Nebraska. He received his B.A. from Harvard College in 1943. Upon graduation from Harvard, he joined the United States Army Air Forces where he spent three years as a classification specialist stationed in Denver, Colorado and became a buck sergeant. Following service in Army Air Forces, he returned to Harvard, receiving his Ph.D. in 1950.

Academic career
Bouwsma taught at the University of Illinois Urbana-Champaign until 1957 when he accepted a position in the History Department at U.C. Berkeley. After teaching for two years at Harvard (1969–1971), he returned to U.C. Berkeley as Chairman of the History Department, serving in this capacity from 1966 to 1967, and from 1981 to 1983. He was chancellor for academic affairs from 1967 to 1969. He was an elected member of both the American Academy of Arts and Sciences and the American Philosophical Society.

Works
"The Politics of Commynes," The Journal of Modern History Volume 23, Number 4, December 1951
Venice and the Defense of Republican Liberty: Renaissance Values in the Age of the Counter Reformation (University of California Press, 1968)
 John Calvin: A Sixteenth Century Portrait (Oxford University Press, 1988)
 A Usable Past: Essays in European Cultural History (University of California Press, 1990)
"Eclipse of the Renaissance," The American Historical Review Volume 103, Number 1, February 1998
The Waning of the Renaissance, 1550–1640 (Yale University Press, 2000)

References

1923 births
2004 deaths
American people of Dutch descent
Writers from Ann Arbor, Michigan
Harvard College alumni
University of Illinois Urbana-Champaign faculty
University of California, Berkeley College of Letters and Science faculty
Presidents of the American Historical Association
Historians from California
Historians from Michigan
United States Army Air Forces non-commissioned officers
United States Army Air Forces personnel of World War II
Members of the American Philosophical Society